The Lincoln Standard L.S.5 was a modification of the Standard J biplane to accommodate 5 passengers marketed by the Lincoln Aircraft Company (later the Lincoln-Page Aircraft Co.).

Design and development
The L.S.5 was a modification to the Standard J Biplane.

Mexican aviator Emilio Carranza purchased and flew a L.S.5, named "Excelsior", making flights that earned him the reputation of "The Lindbergh of Mexico" in 1927.  It crashed on July 12, 1928, killing Carranza, on a return flight from New York.

Specifications (L.S.5)

See also

References

Biplanes